Filip Lesniak (born 14 May 1996) is a Slovak professional footballer who plays as a midfielder for Polish club Wisła Płock.

Career

Tottenham Hotspur
Lesniak started his football career at FC VSS Kosice in Slovakia before joining the Tottenham Hotspur youth academy in January 2012. After progressing through the ranks of the Tottenham Hotspur Academy, Lesniak signed his first professional contract with the club in July 2014.

At the start of the 2016-17 season Lesniak signed a loan move to Slovan Liberec in the Czech Republic. On 31 July 2016 he made his football league debut against Mlada Boleslav. Lesniak only made two more appearances for Liberec a debut in European football Europa League qualifying round against Admira Wacker Mödling and one domestic cup match. He returned to Tottenham on 31 December 2016.

He made his Premier League debut on 18 May 2017 against Leicester City, providing an assist to Harry Kane who completed his fourth hat-trick of the season. He had been released by Tottenham Hotspur along with 5 other academy players after the expiry of his contract on 9 June 2017.

Aalborg BK
Lesniak moved to Danish Superliga side AaB on 4 July 2017, signing a three-year contract. Upon joining the club, Lesniak was joined up by his compatriot Jakub Sylvestr.

Lesniak made his Aalborg BK debut, coming on as a second-half substitute for Magnus Christensen, in a 4-1 loss against SønderjyskE in the second game of the season.

On 12 July 2019, he was loaned out to Silkeborg IF until the end of the season.

Wisła Płock
On 29 July 2020, he joined Polish club Wisła Płock.

International career
Lesinak represented Slovakia U17, having played in UEFA European Under-17 Championship and FIFA U-17 World Cup, and Slovakia U19.

In March 2016, Lesinak was called up by Slovakia U21 and made his debut, in a 4-0 win over Estonia U21.

Career Statistics

Personal
Lesniak' grandfather, Ján Kozák, was a national player. He has 55 caps for Czechoslovakia and was also head coach of Slovakia. His uncle is Ján Kozák jr.

References

External links
Tottenham profile

1996 births
Sportspeople from Košice
Living people
Slovak footballers
Slovakia youth international footballers
Slovakia under-21 international footballers
Association football midfielders
Slovak expatriate footballers
Expatriate footballers in England
Expatriate men's footballers in Denmark
Expatriate footballers in the Czech Republic
Expatriate footballers in Poland
Slovak expatriate sportspeople in England
Slovak expatriate sportspeople in the Czech Republic
Slovak expatriate sportspeople in Denmark
Slovak expatriate sportspeople in Poland
Premier League players
Slovak Super Liga players
Danish Superliga players
Ekstraklasa players
Tottenham Hotspur F.C. players
FC Slovan Liberec players
AaB Fodbold players
Silkeborg IF players
Wisła Płock players